Lee Mi-Young (born 19 August 1979) is a female shot putter from South Korea.

She finished fourth at the 2003 Asian Championships, sixth at the 2005 Asian Championships, fourth at the 2006 Asian Games and won the silver medal at the 2007 Asian Championships. She also competed at the 2004 Olympic Games, the 2005 World Championships and the 2008 Olympic Games without reaching the final.

Her personal best throw is 17.62 metres, achieved in April 2005 in Kwangju.

Achievements

References

1979 births
Living people
South Korean female shot putters
Athletes (track and field) at the 2004 Summer Olympics
Athletes (track and field) at the 2008 Summer Olympics
Olympic athletes of South Korea
Asian Games medalists in athletics (track and field)
Athletes (track and field) at the 2002 Asian Games
Athletes (track and field) at the 2006 Asian Games
Athletes (track and field) at the 2010 Asian Games
Athletes (track and field) at the 2014 Asian Games
Athletes (track and field) at the 2018 Asian Games
Asian Games bronze medalists for South Korea
Medalists at the 2010 Asian Games